David Low (6 April 1887 – 4 August 1916) was an Australian rules footballer who played with West Torrens in the South Australian Football League (SAFL).

Originally from Broken Hill, Low was a defender and debuted for West Torrens in 1910. He finished second in the 1911 Magarey Medal count and won the Medal the following season, becoming the first specialist defender to ever win it as well as the first from West Torrens. He was also Club Champion that season. During his career he was a regular South Australian interstate representative.

Low enlisted in the army in 1915 and went on to serve in Africa and Europe. He died in London on 4 August 1916 after being badly wounded in action.

External links

Roll of Honour: David Low
National Archives of Australia: David Low

1887 births
1916 deaths
West Torrens Football Club players
Magarey Medal winners
Australian rules footballers from New South Wales
Australian military personnel killed in World War I
North Broken Hill Football Club players